Fides et ratio (Faith and Reason) is an encyclical promulgated by Pope John Paul II on 14 September 1998. It was one of 14 encyclicals issued by John Paul II. The encyclical primarily addresses the relationship between faith and reason.

Cardinal Georges Cottier, who was secretary general of the International Theological Commission from 1989 to 2003, says he was part of the drafting of the encyclical.

Content
Fides et ratio was the first encyclical since Pope Leo XIII's 1879 Aeterni Patris to address the relationship between faith and reason.

The encyclical posits that faith and reason are not only compatible, but essential together. He starts with "Faith and reason are like two wings on which the human spirit rises to the contemplation of truth;" Faith without reason, he argues, leads to superstition. Reason without faith, he argues, leads to nihilism and relativism. He writes:

Although reason creates a "systematic body of knowledge," the Pope avers, its completeness is illusory:

Without a grounding in spiritual truth, he continues, reason has:

On the roles of philosophy and speculative theology as manifested by Augustine:

On the wrong turns in modern philosophy and the duty of the magisterium:

In sum, the Pope "makes this strong and insistent appeal" that "faith and philosophy recover the profound unity which allows them to stand in harmony with their nature without compromising their mutual autonomy. The parrhesia of faith must be matched by the boldness of reason".

See also 
Apophatic theology § The via eminentiae
Credo ut intelligam

References

External links 
Fides et Ratio full text of the English translation from the Vatican website

1998 documents
1998 in Christianity
Christian belief and doctrine
Christian philosophy
Papal encyclicals
Religious philosophical literature
Documents of Pope John Paul II
September 1998 events
Faith in Christianity